"" ("Let us unite, let us become brothers") is the officially recognised anthem of New Caledonia. It was written by a group from the children's choir Mélodia in 2008 and officially adopted in 2010. It is not the national anthem of New Caledonia; as a special collectivity of France, the national anthem is the French national anthem, "La Marseillaise". During official ceremonies or sports events, "La Marseillaise" is performed first, followed by "Soyons unis, devenons frères".

History 
In 1998, the Nouméa Accord delegated greater autonomy to the territory and provided that its people would ultimately have the right to vote for full independence, in 2014 at the earliest and in 2018 at the latest. In the meantime, the Accord provided for the gradual recognition of five "identity signs": an anthem, a motto, local symbols on New Caledonian currency, a flag and a potential new name for the territory.

For the anthem, a competition was held by the Government of New Caledonia in 2008. The winning entry was written in January 2008 by seven New Caledonian children between the ages of 10 and 13 from the children's choral group Mélodia. It was performed for the first time on 26 June 2008.

On 18 August 2010, the Congress of New Caledonia officially adopted the anthem, alongside an official motto (""; "Land of speech, land of sharing") and local symbols on New Caledonian currency. There was not yet agreement on recognition of a flag or a new name for the territory at the time. Congress deputies reserved the possibility of amending the lyrics of the anthem at a later date.

Lyrics
In its long version, the anthem consists of three verses and a chorus. The verses are sung in French; the chorus is sung in Nengone then in French. There were initial plans to translate it eventually into other indigenous languages, which were carried out in the years following the anthem's creation. When only the short version of the anthem is sung, it consists of the third verse and the chorus (in Nengone and French).

Original Nengone chorus 
The following is the original chorus in Nengone written by the Mélodia choir in 2008.

In other languages 
On 24 September 2016, for New Caledonia Day (or Citizenship Day), the Mélodia choral performed a version of the anthem that included the chorus sung in several additional languages, including indigenous languages, Chinese, Réunion Creole and several European languages.

Notes

References 

2008 compositions
Politics of New Caledonia
Oceanian anthems
French anthems
New Caledonian culture
National anthem compositions in F major